This is a list of all published works of the English writer and philologist J. R. R. Tolkien. Tolkien's works were published before and after his death.

Fiction

Middle-earth
1937 The Hobbit, or There and Back Again,  (HM)
1954–1955 The Lord of the Rings
1954 The Fellowship of the Ring: being the first volume of The Lord of the Rings,  (HM)
1954 The Two Towers: being the second volume of The Lord of the Rings,  (HM)
1955 The Return of the King: being the third volume of The Lord of the Rings,  (HM)

Poetry books
1962 The Adventures of Tom Bombadil and Other Verses from the Red Book
1967 The Road Goes Ever On, with Donald Swann, a song-cycle

Posthumous
1974 Bilbo's Last Song
1975 Guide to the Names in The Lord of the Rings (edited version) published in A Tolkien Compass by Jared Lobdell. Written by Tolkien for use by translators of The Lord of the Rings, a full version, re-titled "Nomenclature of The Lord of the Rings," was published in 2005 in The Lord of the Rings: A Reader's Companion by Wayne G. Hammond and Christina Scull, 
1977 The Silmarillion edited by Christopher Tolkien with the assistance of Guy Gavriel Kay.  (HM)
1980 Unfinished Tales of Númenor and Middle-earth edited by Christopher Tolkien,  (HM)
1983–1996 The History of Middle-earth compiled and edited by Christopher Tolkien (a combined index of the series was published in 2002):
The Book of Lost Tales 1 (1983)
The Book of Lost Tales 2 (1984)
The Lays of Beleriand (1985)
The Shaping of Middle-earth (1986)
The Lost Road and Other Writings (1987)
The Return of the Shadow (The History of The Lord of the Rings vol. 1) (1988)
The Treason of Isengard (The History of The Lord of the Rings vol. 2) (1989)
The War of the Ring (The History of The Lord of the Rings vol. 3) (1990)
Sauron Defeated (The History of The Lord of the Rings vol. 4, including The Notion Club Papers) (1992)
Morgoth's Ring (The Later Silmarillion vol. 1) (1993)
The War of the Jewels (The Later Silmarillion vol. 2) (1994)
The Peoples of Middle-earth (1996)
2005 Guide to the Names in The Lord of the Rings (full version) published in The Lord of the Rings: A Reader's Companion  by Wayne G. Hammond and Christina Scull . Re-titled to "Nomenclature of The Lord of the Rings" in this book. Written by Tolkien for use by translators of The Lord of the Rings; an edited version was Lobdell 1975 (above).
2007 The Children of Húrin edited by Christopher Tolkien
2007 The History of The Hobbit by John D. Rateliff - contains substantial text fragments
2017 Beren and Lúthien edited by Christopher Tolkien
2018 The Fall of Gondolin edited by Christopher Tolkien
2021 The Nature of Middle-earth edited by Carl F. Hostetter
2022 The Fall of Númenor edited by Brian Sibley

Short works
1945 "Leaf by Niggle" (short story), published in The Dublin Review
1945 The Lay of Aotrou and Itroun (poem), published in The Welsh Review
1949 Farmer Giles of Ham (medieval fable)
1953 The Homecoming of Beorhtnoth Beorhthelm's Son (a play written in alliterative verse), published with the accompanying essays Beorhtnoth's Death and Ofermod, in Essays and Studies by members of the English Association, volume 6.
1964 Tree and Leaf (On Fairy-Stories and Leaf by Niggle in book form)
1966 The Tolkien Reader (The Homecoming of Beorhtnoth Beorhthelm's Son, On Fairy-Stories, Leaf by Niggle, Farmer Giles of Ham, and The Adventures of Tom Bombadil)
1967 Smith of Wootton Major (short story), published as an illustrated chapbook

Poetry

Unless stated otherwise, the years indicate the date of composition.
The Battle of the Eastern Field 1911
From the many-willow'd margin of the immemorial Thames 1913
The Voyage of Eärendel the Evening Star (The Book of Lost Tales 2 267-269) 1914
The Bidding of the Minstrel 1914 (The Book of Lost Tales 2 261f., 269f.)
Tinfang Warble 1914 (The Book of Lost Tales 1 107f.)
Goblin Feet 1915
You and Me / and the Cottage of Lost Play 1915 (The Book of Lost Tales 1 27f.)
Kôr 1915, published as The City of the Gods in 1923 (The Book of Lost Tales 1 136)
Kortirion among the Trees 1915 (revised in 1937 and the 1960s, The Trees of Kortirion)
Over Old Hills and Far Away 1915
A Song of Aryador 1915
The Shores of Elfland 1915
Habbanan beneath the Stars 1916
The Sorrowful City 1916
The Song of Eriol 1917 (The Book of Lost Tales 2 298ff.)
The Horns of Ulmo 1917
The Happy Mariners, published in 1920, composed in 1915
The Children of Húrin (begun in 1920 or earlier, continued to 1925) (The Lays of Beleriand)
The Clerke's Compleinte 1922
Iúmonna Gold Galdre Bewunden 1923
The Eadigan Saelidan 1923
Why the Man in the Moon Came Down Too Soon 1923
Enigmata Saxonic - a Nuper Inventa Duo 1923
The Cat and the Fiddle: A Nursery-Rhyme Undone and its Scandalous Secret Unlocked 1923
An Evening in Tavrobel 1924
The Lonely Isle 1924
The Princess Ni 1924
Light as Leaf on Lindentree 1925
The Flight of the Noldoli from Valinor 1925 (The Lays of Beleriand)
The Lay of Leithian 1925-1931 (The Lays of Beleriand)
The Lay of Eärendel 1920s (The Lays of Beleriand)
The Nameless Land 1926
Adventures in Unnatural History and Mediaeval Metres, being the Freaks of Fisiologus 1927:
Fastitocalon
Iumbo
Tinfang Warble, published in 1927, composed in 1914
Mythopoeia, circa 1931 (published in Tree and Leaf)
Progress in Bimble Town 1931
Errantry 1933
Firiel 1934
Looney 1934
Songs for the Philologists, with E.V. Gordon et al., published 1936:
Bagme Bloma
Éadig Béo þu!
Frenchmen Froth
From One to Five
I Sat upon a Bench
Ides Ælfscýne
La Húru
Lit and Lang
Natura Apis: Morali Ricardi Eremite
Ofer Wídne Gársecg
The Root of the Boot
Ruddoc Hana
Syx Mynet
The Road Goes Ever On in The Hobbit, 1937, and three more versions in The Lord of the Rings, 1954-1955
The Dragon's Visit 1937
Knocking at the Door: Lines induced by sensations when waiting for an answer at the door of an Exalted Academic Person 1937
The Lay of Aotrou and Itroun, published in Welsh Review, December 1945
Imram (The Death of St. Brendan) 1946 (published in Time and Tide, December 1955, Sauron Defeated 261ff, 296ff)
Elvish translations of Catholic prayers (ed. Wynne, Smith, Hostetter in Vinyar Tengwar 43, 44, 2002), composed in the 1950s:
Ataremma versions (Quenya Pater Noster) versions I-VI
Aia María (Quenya Ave Maria) versions I-IV
Litany of Loreto in Quenya
Ortírielyanna (Quenya Sub tuum praesidium)
Alcar i Ataren (Quenya Gloria Patri)
Alcar mi tarmenel na Erun (Quenya Gloria in Excelsis Deo)
Ae Adar Nín (Sindarin Pater Noster)
The Homecoming of Beorhtnoth Beorhthelm's Son 1953
A Walking Song two versions in The Lord of the Rings, 1954-1955
The Adventures of Tom Bombadil published in 1962:
The Adventures of Tom Bombadil
Bombadil Goes Boating
Errantry
Little Princess Mee
The Man in the Moon Stayed Up Too Late
The Man in the Moon Came Down Too Soon
The Stone Troll
Perry-the-Winkle
The Mewlips
Oliphaunt
Fastitocalon
The Cat
Shadow-Bride
The Hoard
The Sea-Bell
The Last Ship
Once upon a time 1965
Bilbo's Last Song 1966 (first published in 1974, as a poster)
For W. H. A. in 1967 in Shenandoah
King Sheave in The Lost Road in 1987 in The Lost Road and Other Writings
Narqelion published in 1988 in Mythlore

Academic and other works
1919-1920 contributions to the Oxford English Dictionary, described in The Ring of Words: Tolkien and the Oxford English Dictionary
1922 A Middle English Vocabulary, Oxford, Clarendon Press, 168 pp.
1925 Sir Gawain and the Green Knight, co-edited with E.V. Gordon, Oxford University Press, 211 pp.; Revised edition 1967, Oxford, Clarendon Press, 232 pp.
1925 Some Contributions to Middle-English Lexicography, published in The Review of English Studies, volume 1, no, 2, pp, 210-215.
1925 The Devil's Coach Horses, published in The Review of English Studies, volume 1, no, 3, pp, 331-336.
1929 Ancrene Wisse and Hali Meiðhad, published in Essays and Studies by members of the English Association, Oxford, volume 14, pp, 104-126.
1932 The Name 'Nodens', concerning the name Nodens, published in Report on the Excavation of the Prehistoric, Roman, and Post-Roman Site in Lydney Park, Gloucestershire, Oxford, University Press for The Society of Antiquaries.
1932-34 Sigelwara Land parts I and II, in Medium Aevum, Oxford, volume 1, no, 3 (December 1932), pp, 183-196 and volume 3, no, 2 (June 1934), pp, 95-111.
1934 Chaucer as a Philologist: The Reeve's Tale, in Transactions of the Philological Society, London, pp, 1-70 (rediscovery of dialect humour, introducing the Hengwrt manuscript into textual criticism of Chaucer's The Canterbury Tales)
1937 Beowulf: The Monsters and the Critics, London, Humphrey Milford, 56 pp. (publication of his 1936 lecture on Beowulf criticism)
1939 The Reeve's Tale: version prepared for recitation at the 'summer diversions', Oxford, 14 pp.
1939 On Fairy-Stories (1939 Andrew Lang lecture) - concerning Tolkien's philosophy on fantasy, this lecture was a shortened version of an essay later published in full in 1947.
1944 Sir Orfeo, Oxford, The Academic Copying Office, 18 pp. (an edition of the medieval poem)
1947 On Fairy-Stories (essay - published in Essays presented to Charles Williams, Oxford University Press) - first full publication of an essay concerning Tolkien's philosophy on fantasy, and which had been presented in shortened form as the 1939 Andrew Lang lecture.
1953 Ofermod and Beorhtnoth's Death, two essays published with the poem The Homecoming of Beorhtnoth, Beorhthelm's Son in Essays and Studies by members of the English Association, volume 6.
1953 Middle English "Losenger": Sketch of an etymological and semantic enquiry, published in Essais de philologie moderne: Communications présentées au Congrès International de Philologie Moderne (1951), Les Belles Lettres.
1958 The Old English Apollonius of Tyre, Oxford University Press - editorial prefatory note
1962 Ancrene Wisse: The English Text of the Ancrene Riwle, Early English Text Society, Oxford University Press.
1963 English and Welsh, in Angles and Britons: O'Donnell Lectures, University of Cardiff Press.
1964 Introduction to Tree and Leaf, with details of the composition and history of Leaf by Niggle and On Fairy-Stories.
1966 Contributions to the Jerusalem Bible (as translator and lexicographer)
1966 Foreword to the Second Edition of The Lord of the Rings, with Tolkien's comments on the varied reaction to his work, his motivation for writing the work, and his opinion of allegory.
1966 Tolkien on Tolkien (autobiographical)
1969 The Rivers and Beacon-Hills of Gondor

Posthumous publications

1975 Translations of Sir Gawain and the Green Knight, Pearl and Sir Orfeo
1976 The Father Christmas Letters. Edited by Baillie Tolkien, a daughter-in-law of Tolkien
1980 Poems and Stories (a compilation of The Adventures of Tom Bombadil, The Homecoming of Beorhtnoth Beorhthelm's Son, On Fairy-Stories, Leaf by Niggle, Farmer Giles of Ham and Smith of Wootton Major)
1981 The Letters of J. R. R. Tolkien (edited by Christopher Tolkien and Humphrey Carpenter)
1981 The Old English "Exodus" Text, translation and commentary by J. R. R. Tolkien; edited by Joan Turville-Petre. Clarendon Press, Oxford
1982 Finn and Hengest: The Fragment and the Episode
1982 Mr. Bliss
1983 The Monsters and the Critics (an essay collection)
Beowulf: The Monsters and the Critics (1936)
On Translating Beowulf (1940)
On Fairy-Stories (1947)
A Secret Vice (1930)
English and Welsh (1955)
1995 J. R. R. Tolkien: Artist and Illustrator - a compilation of Tolkien's artwork
1998 Roverandom
2002 A Tolkien Miscellany - (a compilation of Smith of Wootton Major, Farmer Giles of Ham, The Adventures of Tom Bombadil, Tree and Leaf, and Tolkien's translations of Sir Gawain and the Green Knight, Pearl and Sir Orfeo)
2002 Beowulf and the Critics ed. Michael D.C. Drout (Beowulf: The Monsters and the Critics together with two drafts of the longer essay from which it was condensed)
2008 Tales from the Perilous Realm (a compilation of Roverandom, Farmer Giles of Ham, The Adventures of Tom Bombadil, Smith of Wootton Major, Leaf by Niggle and On Fairy-Stories)
2009 The Legend of Sigurd and Gudrún
2013 The Fall of Arthur (a narrative poem about King Arthur of Britain)
2014 Beowulf: A Translation and Commentary (ed. Christopher Tolkien; includes "Sellic Spell")
2015 The Story of Kullervo (ed. Verlyn Flieger)
2016 A Secret Vice
2016 The Lay of Aotrou and Itroun, originally published in Welsh Review, 1945

Constructed languages
A large volume of Tolkien's writings on his constructed languages, primarily the Elvish languages such as Quenya and Sindarin, was published and annotated by scholars in the journals Vinyar Tengwar and Parma Eldalamberon.

1989 "The Plotz Quenya Declensions", first published in part in the fanzine Beyond Bree, and later in full in Vinyar Tengwar 6, p, 14.
1991 "Koivieneni Sentence" in Vinyar Tengwar 14, pp, 5-20.
1992 "New Tengwar Inscription" in Vinyar Tengwar 21, p, 6.
1992 "Liège Tengwar Inscription" in Vinyar Tengwar 23, p, 16.
1993 "Two Trees Sentence" in Vinyar Tengwar 27, pp, 7-42.
1993 "Koivieneni Manuscript" in Vinyar Tengwar 27, pp, 7-42.
1993 "The Bodleian Declensions", in Vinyar Tengwar 28, pp, 9-34.
1994 "The Entu Declension" in Vinyar Tengwar 36, pp, 8-29.
1995 "Gnomish Lexicon", Parma Eldalamberon 11.
1995 "Rúmilian Document" in Vinyar Tengwar 37, pp, 15-23.
1998 "Qenya Lexicon" Parma Eldalamberon 12.
1998 "Osanwe-kenta, Enquiry into the communication of thought", Vinyar Tengwar 39
1998 "From Quendi and Eldar, Appendix D." Vinyar Tengwar 39, pp, 4-20.
1999 "Narqelion", Vinyar Tengwar 40, pp, 5-32
2000 "Etymological Notes: Osanwe-kenta" Vinyar Tengwar 41, pp, 5-6
2000 "From The Shibboleth of Fëanor" (written ca. 1968) Vinyar Tengwar 41, pp, 7-10 (A part of the Shibboleth of Fëanor was published in The Peoples of Middle-earth, pp, 331-366)
2000 "Notes on Óre" Vinyar Tengwar 41, pp, 11-19
2000 "Merin Sentence" Tyalie Tyalieva 14, pp, 32-35
2001 "The Rivers and Beacon-hills of Gondor" (written 1967-1969) Vinyar Tengwar 42, pp, 5-31.
2001 "Essay on negation in Quenya" Vinyar Tengwar 42, pp, 33-34.
2001 "Goldogrim Pronominal Prefixes" Parma Eldalamberon 13 p, 97.
2001 "Early Noldorin Grammar", Parma Eldalamberon 13, pp, 119-132.
2002 "Words of Joy: Five Catholic Prayers in Quenya (Part One), Vinyar Tengwar 43:
"Ataremma" (Pater Noster in Quenya) versions I-VI, pp. 4-26
"Aia María" (Ave Maria in Quenya) versions I-IV, pp. 26-36
"Alcar i Ataren" (Gloria Patri in Quenya), pp, 36-38
2002 "Words of Joy: Five Catholic Prayers in Quenya (Part Two), Vinyar Tengwar 44:
"Litany of Loreto" in Quenya, pp. 11-20.
"Ortírielyanna" (Sub tuum praesidium in Quenya), pp. 5-11
"Alcar mi tarmenel na Erun" (Gloria in Excelsis Deo in Quenya), pp. 31-38.
"Ae Adar Nín" (Pater Noster in Sindarin) Vinyar Tengwar 44, pp. 21-30.
2003 "Early Qenya Fragments", Parma Eldalamberon 14.
2003 "Early Qenya Grammar", Parma Eldalamberon 14.
2003 "The Valmaric Scripts", Parma Eldalamberon 14.
2004 "Sí Qente Feanor and Other Elvish Writings", ed. Smith, Gilson, Wynne, and Welden, Parma Eldalamberon 15.
2005 "Eldarin Hands, Fingers & Numerals (Part One)." Edited by Patrick H. Wynne. Vinyar Tengwar 47, pp, 3-43.
2005 "Eldarin Hands, Fingers & Numerals (Part Two)." Edited by Patrick H. Wynne. Vinyar Tengwar 48, pp, 4-34.
2006 "Pre-Fëanorian Alphabets", Part 1, ed. Smith, Parma Eldalamberon 16.
2006 "Early Elvish Poetry: Oilima Markirya, Nieninqe and Earendel", ed. Gilson, Welden, and Hostetter, Parma Eldalamberon 16
2006 "Qenya Declensions", "Qenya Conjugations", "Qenya Word-lists", ed. Gilson, Hostetter, Wynne, Parma Eldalamberon 16
2007 "Eldarin Hands, Fingers & Numerals (Part Three)." Edited by Patrick H. Wynne. Vinyar Tengwar 49, pp, 3-37.
2007 "Five Late Quenya Volitive Inscriptions." Vinyar Tengwar 49, pp, 38-58.
2007 "Ambidexters Sentence", Vinyar Tengwar 49
2007 "Words, Phrases and Passages in Various Tongues in The Lord of the Rings", edited by Gilson, Parma Eldalamberon 17.
2009 "Tengwesta Qenderinwa", ed. Gilson, Smith and Wynne, Parma Eldalamberon 18.
2009 "Pre-Fëanorian Alphabets, Part 2", Parma Eldalamberon 18.
2010 "Quenya Phonology", Parma Eldalamberon 19.
2010 "Comparative Tables", Parma Eldalamberon 19.
2010 "Outline of Phonetic Development", Parma Eldalamberon 19.
2010 "Outline of Phonology", Parma Eldalamberon 19.
2012 "The Quenya Alphabet", Parma Eldalamberon 20.
2013 "Qenya: Declension of Nouns", Parma Eldalamberon 21.
2013 "Primitive Quendian: Final Consonants", Parma Eldalamberon 21.
2013 "Common Eldarin: Noun Structure", Parma Eldalamberon 21.
2015 "The Fëanorian Alphabet, Part 1", Parma Eldalamberon 22.
2015 "Quenya Verb Structure", Parma Eldalamberon 22.

Audio recordings
1967 Poems and Songs of Middle-earth, Caedmon TC 1231
1975 J. R. R. Tolkien Reads and Sings his The Hobbit & The Lord of the Rings, Caedmon TC 1477, TC 1478 (based on an August 1952 recording by George Sayer)

Art
1979 Pictures by J.R.R. Tolkien, George Allen & Unwin, text by Christopher Tolkien, . 2nd edition 1992. 
1995 J. R. R. Tolkien: Artist & Illustrator (text by Wayne G. Hammond and Christina Scull)
2011 The Art of The Hobbit by J. R. R. Tolkien (text by Wayne G. Hammond and Christina Scull)
2015 The Art of The Lord of the Rings by J. R. R. Tolkien (text by Wayne G. Hammond and Christina Scull)

See also

Tolkien research
Translations of The Lord of the Rings
Translations of The Hobbit
Works inspired by J. R. R. Tolkien

Notes

References

 
Bibliographies by writer
Bibliographies of British writers
Fantasy bibliographies
Poetry bibliographies